The Oesling or Ösling is a region covering the northern part of both the Grand Duchy of Luxembourg and Eifelkreis Bitburg-Prüm, within the greater Ardennes area that also covers parts of Belgium and France. The Oesling covers 32% of the territory of Luxembourg; to the south of the Oesling lies the Gutland (literally "Good Land"), which covers the remaining 68% of the Grand Duchy as well as the southern part of the Eifelkreis Bitburg-Prüm.

Features

The region is characterised by hills and large deciduous forests.  Almost all of Luxembourg's tallest hills are in the Oesling, particularly in the north and north-west, near the borders with Belgium and Germany.  Its main hill chains are cut by scenic river valleys, most notable those of the Clerve, Our, upper Sauer, and Wiltz.

Towns and villages

The Oesling is sparsely populated, with few larger towns; Clervaux, Vianden and Wiltz are the largest ones in the Luxembourgish part of the Oesling, of which only Wiltz has a population of over 6,000 people. The area is known for its hill-side villages, which rely upon the visitors that the tourist season brings.

History

In the late 18th century, a popular, rural rising against the French Revolutionary forces was centered upon the Oesling area.

In World War II, the Battle of the Bulge was partly fought in the region in late 1944 and early 1945.

Regionalist pressures

In the 2004 legislative election, the Free Party of Luxembourg, a small regionalist party based in the Oesling and led by local personality Jean Ersfeld, offered candidates, but none were elected.  The party had difficulty in continuing to organize after the election.

Landscapes of Rhineland-Palatinate
Regions of Luxembourg
Regions of the Eifel
Ardennes